Justin Christopher Wren (born April 27, 1987) is an American humanitarian worker and a professional mixed martial artist, currently competing in the heavyweight division of Bellator MMA. A professional competitor since 2006, Wren has also formerly competed for the UFC, and was a cast member of SpikeTV's The Ultimate Fighter: Heavyweights.

Amateur wrestling career
Wren enjoyed a highly successful and decorated wrestling career before venturing into MMA. He was a standout at Texas wrestling powerhouse Bishop Lynch High School, where he was coached by Olympic Gold Medalists Kenny Monday and Kendall Cross. During that time, he was a two time Prep State Champion (2004, 2005) and a two time Prep all-American, winning the Prep National Championship his senior year in Lehigh, Pennsylvania.

While he was indeed a standout collegiate-style wrestler, Wren's greatest success came in the Greco Roman style. He was a two time All-American in that discipline, winning the national championship in Fargo, ND the summer after his senior year in high school ('05). This championship gained him national attention and earned him a scholarship to the U.S. Olympic Education Center at Northern Michigan University to train for the Olympics to compete in Greco Roman wrestling.

Mixed martial arts
Wanting to try his hand at Division I college wrestling, Wren attended Iowa State University to compete for then coach Cael Sanderson, however, he sustained an injury training before he could join the team. To stay active, Wren entered local fights around Iowa and began his MMA career.

Wren won his first three fights by knockout before taking his first loss. His opponent was Matt Thompson. Wren then won five more fights and was ten and one before appearing on TUF. Heading into the tenth installment of The Ultimate Fighter, Wren had trained all over the world but found his permanent home in Denver, CO with TUF 10 coach Trevor Wittman.

The Ultimate Fighter
Wren was on the tenth season of The Ultimate Fighter fighting for Team Rashad. He was picked third for his team and fifth overall. On episode five, Wren fought UFC veteran Wes Sims, defeating him via first round technical submission from an arm triangle.

Wren then moved on to the quarter-finals and fought Roy Nelson in a controversial two round majority decision loss that many spectators at ring side, including Dana White, felt should have gone to a third round.

Ultimate Fighting Championship
Wren would go on make his UFC debut at The Ultimate Finale 10, against Ultimate Fighter 10 castmate, Jon Madsen, to whom he lost via split decision.
Wren was later released from the UFC.

Post-UFC
On Jan. 23, 2010 Wren announced he had signed a deal with an unnamed promotion. Then on Jan. 26, the promotion was named as Ring of Fire MMA, based in Colorado. He fought and defeated Josh Henry in his debut for Ring of Fire by TKO in the first round.

After injuring his back from a slam in his victory over Josh Robertson, Wren underwent a corrective procedure to repair six or seven discs in his back.

Bellator MMA
In July 2015, Wren signed a five-fight contract with Bellator MMA.  After five years away from the sport, Wren made his promotional debut against Josh Burns at Bellator 141 on August 28, 2015.  He won the fight by unanimous decision. He won his second Bellator bout against Juan Torres on February 19, 2016, also by unanimous decision.

Wren faced Roman Pizzolato at Bellator 174 on March 3, 2017. He won via submission due to an arm-triangle choke in the first round.

Mixed martial arts record

|-
| Win
|align=center| 13–2
| Roman Pizzolato
| Submission (arm-triangle choke)
|Bellator 174
|
|align=center| 1
|align=center| 2:35
|Thackerville, Oklahoma, United States
|
|-
| Win
|align=center| 12–2
| Juan Torres
| Decision (unanimous)
|Bellator 149
|
|align=center| 3
|align=center| 5:00
|Houston, Texas, United States
|
|-
| Win
|align=center| 11–2
| Josh Burns
| Decision (unanimous)
|Bellator 141
|
|align=center| 3
|align=center| 5:00
|Temecula, California, United States
|
|-
|Win
|align=center|10–2
| Josh Robertson
|Submission (rear-naked choke)
|Fight Force International: Blood & Sand 8
|
|align=center|2
|align=center|4:55
| Biloxi, Mississippi, United States
|
|- 
|Win
|align=center|9–2
| Reggie Higgins
|Decision (unanimous)
|MMA Xplosion: Fight Night II at the Hard Rock
|
|align=center|3
|align=center|5:00
|Las Vegas, Nevada, United States
|
|- 
|Win
|align=center|8–2
| Josh Henry
|TKO (punches)
|Ring of Fire 37: Warlords
|
|align=center|1
|align=center|1:20
|Omaha, Nebraska, United States
|
|- 
|Loss
|align=center|7–2
| Jon Madsen
|Decision (split)
|The Ultimate Fighter: Heavyweights Finale
|
|align=center|3
|align=center|5:00
|Las Vegas, Nevada, United States
|
|- 
|Win
|align=center|7–1
| Lamar Coleman
|Submission (arm-triangle choke)
|Brutaal: Hilton Coliseum
|
|align=center|1
|align=center|1:03
|Ames, Iowa, United States
|
|- 
|Win
|align=center|6–1
| Chris Guillen
|TKO (punches)
|Xp3: The Proving Ground
|
|align=center|2
|align=center|1:45
|Houston, Texas, United States
|
|- 
|Win
|align=center|5–1
| Ralph Kelly
|TKO (corner stoppage)
|C3 Fights: Contenders
|
|align=center|2
|align=center|3:00
|Oklahoma City, Oklahoma, United States
|
|- 
|Win
|align=center|4–1
| Tony Guined
|Submission (guillotine choke)
|Ultra Pure Productions: Graveyard Smash
|
|align=center|1
|align=center|3:04
|Conroe, Texas, United States
|
|- 
|Loss
|align=center|3–1
| Matt Thompson
|TKO (referee stoppage)
|Art of War 2
|
|align=center|2
|align=center|0:27
|Austin, Texas, United States
|
|- 
|Win
|align=center|3–0
| Justin Howard
|TKO (punches)
|Art of War 1
|
|align=center|2
|align=center|1:32
|Dallas, Texas, United States
|
|- 
|Win
|align=center|2–0
| Brian Ewers
|TKO (punches)
|ECF: Winter War
|
|align=center|1
|align=center|0:42
|Spirit Lake, Iowa, United States
|
|- 
|Win
|align=center|1–0
| Ronald Stackhouse
|TKO (punches)
|Masters of the Cage 7
|
|align=center|1
|align=center|1:45
|Norman, Oklahoma, United States
|

Humanitarian work
Justin has done a number of charity drives and expeditions for his charity Fight for the Forgotten, with his work being featured on The Joe Rogan Experience. He published an account of his life (co-authored by Loretta Hunt) and work with Mbuti pygmy tribes, also entitled 'Fight for the Forgotten', in September 2015.

Justin has used a portion of his earnings from MMA to buy land and build fresh water wells for the Mbuti pygmy people in the Democratic Republic of Congo. His solution uses local workforce and can be walked into areas otherwise inaccessible to well drilling machinery; initially they find well locations using a vertical electrical sounding machine.

Personal life
Wren is a Christian. He lives in Austin, Tx.

Podcast
Justin Wren, with his partner Amy Edwards, runs the Overcome with Justin Wren podcast. The podcast focuses on overcoming childhood trauma, sexual abuse, immense bullying, depression, suicidal ideation, self-imposed substance abuse, addiction and suicide prevention.

See also
 List of current Bellator fighters

References

External links
 
 

1987 births
Living people
Sportspeople from Dallas
American male mixed martial artists
Heavyweight mixed martial artists
Mixed martial artists utilizing collegiate wrestling
Mixed martial artists utilizing Greco-Roman wrestling
Mixed martial artists utilizing Brazilian jiu-jitsu
Mixed martial artists from Texas
American male sport wrestlers
American practitioners of Brazilian jiu-jitsu
Christians from Texas